The Filardi House, also known as Casa Muñoz, is a historic house with ground-level commercial space in Yauco, Puerto Rico. It is notable for the extensive use of concrete sculptural ornamentation on its facade. Italian immigrant Vicente Filardi, a contractor with business in Ponce and Yauco, designed and built the house in 1916 with his sons Juan Bautista and Domingo. The younger Filardis were responsible for the integration of the elaborate decorative features with the overall Beaux-Arts plan, and later came to be recognized as experts in production of ornamental elements of cast concrete.

The house was added to the U.S. National Register of Historic Places in 1985.

See also
 National Register of Historic Places listings in Yauco, Puerto Rico
 Alex Llombart Filardi
 Carmelo Filardi

References

External links
Summary sheet from the Puerto Rico State Historic Preservation Office 

National Register of Historic Places in Yauco, Puerto Rico
Houses completed in 1916
Houses on the National Register of Historic Places in Puerto Rico
Beaux-Arts architecture in Puerto Rico
1916 establishments in Puerto Rico